This is a list of churches in  Gentofte Municipality, Greater Copenhagen, Denmark.

Church of Denmark

Roman–Catholic

See also
 List of Churches in Gladsaxe municipality

References

External links

Lists of buildings and structures in Copenhagen
 
Gentofte